Legislative elections were held in France on 16 and 30 November 1919, the first after World War I.

Electoral system
Proportional representation by department replaced the two-round system by arrondissements in use since 1889. However, a provision of the system allowed a party to win all the seats in a certain constituency if it had won over 50% of all votes cast.

Campaign
The formation of electoral lists needed to take into account of three factors: on one hand, the tendency of the opinion to think that the Union sacrée needed to be prolonged in peacetime in order to solve the new problems of France of the post-war period; on the other hand, the refusal of the French Section of the Workers' International (SFIO), then in crisis, to discuss the question of the Bolshevism. To preserve their unity, the Socialists decided in April 1919 not to conclude any agreement ahead of the legislative elections. This decision isolated the radicals, forced to give up a new alliance of the left, and allowed an aggressive campaign of the right and centre directed against the SFIO, accused of Bolshevism; finally, the persistence of partisan divisions within the right. The monarchists of Action française were isolated, but the nationalists, the Catholics, and the "progressives" (who are in fact the moderate republicans from the pre-war period) brought together the moderate republicans of the center-right, gathered in several small organizations, all members of Democratic Alliance, but rejected any possibility of an agreement with the radicals. The radicals were found stuck between the SFIO which hesitated between radicalization and the status quo, and a right more than ever anti-leftist.

Following complex negotiations, 324 lists were formed. The Socialists chose homogeneous lists, while the radicals divided between lists allied with the center-right and isolated lists. The lists of the Bloc National gathered the members of the Democratic Republican Alliance, the progressives, the nationalists and the Catholics. Alexandre Millerand managed to gather around him a very broad coalition in his stronghold of the second sector of the Seine by advocating a reinforcement of the presidential powers.

Results
The results were, except for the SFIO, which made gains, managing to run candidates in all constituencies; rather confusing. Radicals, particularly when they were isolated, tended to decline, and the victory of the Bloc National was without ambiguity: a blue wave hit the Chamber of Deputies, called the "blue horizon chamber", because of the great number of ex-World War I servicemen who sat there (44% of the total of the deputies). This victory would remain the largest victory of the right and the centre-right until the 1968 legislative election. 60% of the deputies in this legislature were newly elected.

References

Popular Vote on France-politique.fr
Parliamentary Groups on France-politique.fr

Legislative elections in France
France
Legislative
France